Albertatherium (meaning "beast of Alberta") is an extinct genus of alphadontid metatherians that lived during the Late Cretaceous of North America. The genus contains two species, Albertatherium primus (the type species), and Albertatherium secundus. Fossils have been found in the Eagle Formation of Montana and the Milk River Formation of Alberta.

Taxonomy 
Albertatherium is a member of the Alphadontidae, an extinct family of metatherians closely related to marsupials. Recent phylogenetic studies group it with other northern non-marsupial metatherians such as Alphadon and Turgidodon. A 2016 phylogenetic analysis is shown below.

References 

Prehistoric metatherians
Prehistoric mammal genera
Late Cretaceous mammals of North America
Paleontology in Alberta
Cretaceous Canada
Fossils of Canada
Paleontology in Montana
Cretaceous United States
Fossils of the United States
Milk River Formation
Fossil taxa described in 1971